Anusuya Chinsamy-Turan is a South African vertebrate paleontologist known for her expertise and developments in the study of the microstructure of fossil teeth and bones of extinct and extant vertebrates. She was the head of the Department of Biological Sciences (originally the Department of Zoology), at the University of Cape Town from 2012 to 2015 .

Education and career

Chinsamy-Turan received a B.Sc. from the University of Witwatersrand in 1983 and a B.Sc. Honours in 1984, a U.H.D.E. (University Higher Diploma in Education) from the University of Durban-Westville (now called University of Kwazulu-Natal) in 1985, and a Ph.D. (1991) from Witwatersrand. She then proceeded to do a postdoctorate at the University of Pennsylvania (1992-1994).

She is the author of six books; two academic works, The Microstructure of Dinosaur Bone - Deciphering Biology Through Fine Scale Techniques, published in 2005, by the Johns Hopkins University Press and Forerunners of Mammals -Radiation. Biology published by the Indiana University Press in 2012; a children's book, Famous dinosaurs of Africa, published in 2008, and a popular level book, Fossils For Africa, published in 2014 by Cambridge University Press. Her two most recent books (2021) are fior children and are entitled "Dinosaurs and other Prehistoric life" and " African Dinosaurs".

Awards
Chinsamy-Turan won "Distinguished Women Scientist Award" from the South African Department of Science and Technology in 2002, and won the "South African Woman of the Year Award" in 2005. The National Research Foundation of South Africa awarded her its "President's Award" in 1995 and the "Transformation Award" in 2012.

In 2013, she won The World Academy of Science (TWAS) Sub-Saharan Prize for the Public Understanding and Popularization of Science.

Selected publications
Chinsamy, A, Buffetaut, E, Angst, D., Canoville, A. 2014. Insight into the growth dynamics and systematic affinities of the Late Cretaceous Gargantuavis from bone microstructure. Naturwissenschaften 101:447-452
 Chinsamy, A., Chiappe, L.,  Marugán-Lobón, J., Chunling, G. and Fengjiao, Z. 2013. Gender Identification of the Mesozoic bird Confuciusornis sanctus. Nature Communications. 
 Chinsamy, A. Thomas, D. B., Tumarkin-Deratzian, A. & A. Fiorillo. 2012. Hadrosaurs were perennial polar residents. Anatomical Record, 295 (4): 551–714. 
Jasinoski, S.C. and A. Chinsamy. 2012. Mandibular histology and growth of the non-mammaliaform cynodont Tritylodon. Journal of Anatomy, 220 (6): 564–579.
 Cerda, I. A. & Chinsamy.  2012. Biological Implications of the bone microstructure of the Late Cretaceous ornithopod dinosaur Gasparinisaura cincosaltensis. Journal of Vertebrate Paleontology. 32(2):355-368. 
 Chinsamy, A., Codorniu, L. and L. Chiappe. 2009 The Bone Microstructure of Pterodaustro guinazui. Anatomical Record 292: 1462–1477.
Chinsamy, A., and Tumarkin-Deratzian, A. 2009. Pathological bone tissue in a turkey vulture and a nonavian dinosaur.  Anatomical Record 292: 1478-1484

External links
 Website at University of Cape Town

References

1962 births
Living people
South African paleontologists
Women paleontologists
University of the Witwatersrand alumni
University of Durban-Westville alumni
Academic staff of the University of Cape Town
Fellows of the Royal Society of South Africa
South African women scientists
21st-century women scientists